Susan Dunn Whittier Bottomly (born October 1, 1950), also known as International Velvet, is a former American model and actress. She is known for her appearances in several of Andy Warhol's underground films.

Early life and career
Born in Boston, Bottomly is the daughter of John Bottomly, a lawyer who prosecuted the Boston Strangler. At the age of 16, she began modeling with the Ford Agency and appeared on the cover of Mademoiselle magazine. The following year Bottomly met poet and Factory regular Gerard Malanga who introduced her to Warhol. After appearing in a Screen Test, Bottomly was renamed International Velvet and went on to appear in Since (1966), Superboy (1966), Chelsea Girls (1966), **** (The 24 Hour Movie) (1967), and Midnight Cowboy (1969).

She was, in Warhol's words, "very beautiful". A tall, long-necked brunette with graceful physicality, she impressed the artist deeply. She worked diligently on her personal cosmetics regimen, a process which Warhol observed with fascination: "Watching someone like Susan Bottomly, who had such perfect, full, fine features, doing all this on her face was like watching a beautiful statue painting itself."

References

External links
 
 Susan Bottomly at warholstars.org

Actresses from Massachusetts
Female models from Massachusetts
American film actresses
1950 births
Living people
People associated with The Factory